Wolfgang Weiermann (8 September 1935 – 17 May 2021) was a German politician for the SPD.

Life and politics

Weiermann was born 1935 in Dortmund and was a steelworker and member of the IG Metall, the world's biggest industry union.

Weiermann became member of the SPD in 1955 and was member of the German Bundestag, the federal diet, from 1987 to 2002.

References

1935 births
2021 deaths
Politicians from Dortmund
Members of the Bundestag 1987–1990
Members of the Bundestag 1990–1994
Members of the Bundestag 1994–1998
Members of the Bundestag 1998–2002
Social Democratic Party of Germany politicians